College Days is a 1926 American silent romantic comedy film directed by Richard Thorpe and starring Marceline Day, Charles Delaney, and James Harrison. It was produced by the independent Tiffany Pictures. The film's sets were designed by the art director Edwin B. Willis.

Synopsis
On his first day at the University of California, Jim Gordon meets and falls in love with Mary Ward but also makes an enemy in Kenneth Slade. Mary's feelings are hurt when she sees Jim with another woman, and his attempts to make amends almost get him expelled. At the last moment he is called back to take part in a football game, winning both it and the heart of Mary.

Cast

References

Bibliography
 Connelly, Robert B. The Silents: Silent Feature Films, 1910-36, Volume 40, Issue 2. December Press, 1998.
 Munden, Kenneth White. The American Film Institute Catalog of Motion Pictures Produced in the United States, Part 1. University of California Press, 1997.
 Oriard, Michael. King Football: Sport and Spectacle in the Golden Age of Radio and Newsreels, Movies and Magazines, the Weekly and the Daily Press. University of North Carolina Press, 2005.
 Umphlett, Wiley Lee . The Movies Go to College: Hollywood and the World of the College-Life Film. Fairleigh Dickinson University Press, 1984.

External links

1926 films
1926 comedy films
1920s English-language films
American silent feature films
Silent American comedy films
American black-and-white films
Tiffany Pictures films
Films directed by Richard Thorpe
Films set in universities and colleges
1920s American films